This is a list of monuments in Manang District, Nepal as officially recognized by and available through the website of the Department of Archaeology, Nepal. Manang is a district of Gandaki Province and is located in northern Nepal.

List of monuments

|}

See also 
 List of monuments in Gandaki Province
 List of monuments in Nepal

References 

Manang